The 2015 Big Sky Conference women's basketball tournament was held March 11–14, 2015. The champion of the tournament received an automatic bid to the 2015 NCAA tournament.

Format
Unlike most Division I conference tournaments in basketball, the Big Sky tournament did not involve all of the conference's teams. With the addition of Idaho to the conference for the 2014–15 season, expanding the number of teams from 11 to 12, the tournament expanded from seven teams to eight. As in previous years, qualifying is based on overall conference record. The number of teams that failed to qualify stayed at four. All tournament games were played at the site of the regular-season champion. The women's tournament ran this year with a Wednesday-Friday-Saturday format because Montana hosted both tournaments, having won the women's regular-season title outright and earned men's hosting rights by winning a tiebreaker with regular-season co-champion Eastern Washington. With the move to an 8-seed schedule, the Big Sky also chose to go with the regular 8-seed tournament most other conferences use.

The 2015 tournament was the last to be held at campus sites, and the last in which certain teams were excluded for poor performance. Starting with the 2015–16 season, the Big Sky men's and women's tournaments both expanded to include all conference members (barring NCAA sanctions or self-imposed postseason bans), and both tournaments will be held at a predetermined neutral site. For 2016, both tournaments will be held at the Reno Events Center in Reno, Nevada.

Bracket

All times listed are Mountain

Game Summaries

Sacramento State vs. Montana State
Broadcasters: Jay Sanderson & Krista Redpath Pyron

Northern Colorado vs. North Dakota
Broadcasters: Jay Sanderson & Krista Redpath Pyron

Eastern Washington vs. Northern Arizona
Broadcasters: Jay Sanderson & Krista Redpath Pyron

Montana vs. Idaho State
Broadcasters: Jay Sanderson & Krista Redpath Pyron

Sacramento State vs. Northern Colorado
Broadcasters: Jay Sanderson & Krista Redpath Pyron

Eastern Washington vs. Montana
Broadcasters: Jay Sanderson & Krista Redpath Pyron

Championship: Northern Colorado vs. Montana
Broadcasters: Jay Sanderson & Krista Redpath Pyron

References

External links
 2015 Women's Basketball Championship

2014–15 Big Sky Conference women's basketball season
Big Sky Conference women's basketball tournament
Basketball competitions in Missoula, Montana
College basketball tournaments in Montana
Women's sports in Montana